Malachi Jeddidiah Kittridge (October 12, 1869 – June 23, 1928) was an American professional baseball catcher. He played 16 seasons in Major League Baseball (MLB) between 1890 and 1906, for six different teams, predominantly the Chicago Colts of the National League. He batted and threw right-handed.

Biography
Kittridge was not a good hitter—he had a .219 batting average for his major-league career—but in his career he was regarded as having one of the best throwing arms. In 1904, he was hired as player-manager of the Washington Senators of the American League, but the team started the season , and Kittridge was replaced by Patsy Donovan. The Senators finished with a  record for the season.

Kittridge was traded to the Cleveland Naps in the middle of the 1906 season, but he only had five at bats for the Naps before retiring from baseball. In 1910, Kittridge served as player-manager of the Elgin Kittens in the Class D level Northern Association. The team's "Kittens" moniker was in honor of Kittridge. The team finished in first place.

See also
List of Major League Baseball player–managers

References

Further reading

External links

Encyclopedia of Baseball Catchers

1869 births
1928 deaths
19th-century baseball players
Boston Beaneaters players
Chicago Colts players
Cleveland Naps players
Louisville Colonels players
Major League Baseball catchers
People from Clinton, Massachusetts
Washington Senators (1901–1960) players
Washington Senators (1891–1899) players
Washington Senators (1901–1960) managers
Sportspeople from Worcester County, Massachusetts
Baseball players from Massachusetts
Portsmouth Lillies players
Quincy Black Birds players
Worcester Farmers players
Montreal Royals players
Montreal Royals managers
Dayton Veterans players
Scranton Miners players
Elgin Kittens players
Saginaw Krazy Kats players
Major League Baseball player-managers